The 1637 Group of two 300 ton 'pinnances' to carry fourteen pieces of ordnance and sixteen banks of oars were ordered on 12 December 1636. These vessels would carry thirty pieces of ordnance with ten pairs of  gun ports on the lower deck with two pair forward and four pairs aft on the upper deck. The waist would be unprotected until two more pairs of gun ports were added later. Their measurements would compare favourably to the 'frigate' type vessels built a decade later. Their beam to length ratio of 3.46 to 1 would make a more true frigate than the Constant Warwick.

Design and specifications
The ships were built in Bermondsey under contract. Only order dates and launch dates are available for each ship. The builder's measure tonnage was 304.2 and 405.5 tons. Their builder's measure was  tons.

The gun armaments will be specified on within the ship articles as they varied between the vessels. As built they carried thirty guns of culverins, demi-culverins, and sakers. The initial manning of the ships was120 personnel in 1652, increasing to 140 souls by 1653.

Ships of the 1637 Group

Notes

Citations

References
 British Warships in the Age of Sail (1603 – 1714), by Rif Winfield, published by Seaforth Publishing, England © Rif Winfield 2009, EPUB , Chapter 4, The Fourth Rates - 'Small Ships', Vessels Acquired from 24 March 1603, 1637 Group
 Ships of the Royal Navy, by J.J. Colledge, revised and updated by Lt-Cdr Ben Warlow and Steve Bush, published by Seaforth Publishing, Barnsley, Great Britain, © the estate of J.J. Colledge, Ben Warlow and Steve Bush 2020, EPUB 
 The Arming and Fitting of English Ships of War 1600 - 1815, by Brian Lavery, published by US Naval Institute Press © Brian Lavery 1989, Part V Guns, Type of Guns

 

Ships of the Royal Navy